Kaep'ung County was a county in North Hwanghae Province, North Korea. Formerly part of the Kaesong urban area, the county was merged with North Hwanghae when Kaesong was demoted in 2003. The area is the site of the royal tombs of King Kongmin and King Taejo of the Goryeo dynasty. Famous actor Oh-Yeoung-Su aka Oh-Il-Nam from Squid Game was born here.

Administrative divisions
The county is divided into one town (ŭp) and 18 'ri' (villages).

Transport
Kaep'ung is served by Kaep'ung and Ryohyŏn stations of the Korean State Railway. These are both on the P'yŏngbu line.

See also
Geography of North Korea
Administrative divisions of North Korea

References

 http://nk.joins.com/map/view.asp?idx=i033.htm

Counties of North Hwanghae